Hatch End High School is an eight-form entry 11–18 co-educational academy school in Harrow, North London, England, in the United Kingdom. It was originally named Blackwell School.

The school's examination results at GCSE and A-Level have consistently been in the top 10% of all schools nationally in recent years.

Hatch End High School forms part of the Harrow Sixth Form Collegiate. There are 1100 students across Years 7 to 11 and there are over 300 students in the Sixth Form.

History
 1948/49 – Blackwell School opened.
 1953 – The Great Hall, was completed on site.
 1974 (September) – Hatch End High School Comprehensive Education was introduced in Harrow. Blackwell was renamed.
 1995 – Hatch End's grounds were used to film the TV series The Demon Headmaster.
 2004 – Round House (drama centre) opened.
 2006 – Hatch End sixth Form was established.
 2010 – Hatch End Sixth Form, a new modern building, was opened by Gareth Thomas, local politician and alumnus of the school.
 2011 – Hatch End High school gained academy status.
 2013 – M.U.G.A. opened (floodlit AstroTurf).
 2014 – Hatch End Radio Studio opened and allowed students to host a radio station during 35 minute breaks. The show originally won a world record 'Longest Marathon Radio Show (Team)', by staff members Chris Firth and Richard Parker, the show lasted 74 hours.

 2019 – Hatch End High School opened their new school building.

Governance
The school is a  single academy trust school.

Hatch End High School forms part of the Harrow collegiate Sixth Form. There are over 300 students in the Sixth Form.

The school and Headteacher also play a role in the Harrow Alternative Provision Academy Trust (The Jubilee Academy) and Harrow Academies Trust.

Curriculum
The trust has chosen to run a two-year Key Stage 3 programme where it teaches all the elements of the National Curriculum: that is the core subjects plus a broad range of the Arts, Humanities, Modern Foreign Languages and Design and Technology.This is so the youngster are not excluded from future Ebac possibilities. They then benefit from a three-year Key Stage 4.

In Key Stage 4 they, the students, continue following the National Curriculum Subjects in English; Maths; Science; Physical Education; Religious Education and Personal, Citizenship, Social and Health Education (PCSHE). They choose options from History or Geography or both and a Modern Foreign Language enabling them to gain accreditation in All students will study either History or Geography with the option to study both if desired and the majority of students continue with a Modern Foreign Language enabling them to gain English Baccalaureate accreditation in the five subject areas needed. These subjects are accredited at the end of Year 11. One option subject will be examined at the end of Year 10. Eight GCSEs are expected and 10 GCSEs possible. There is flexibility here to allow for late incomers, with some modules taught in  mixed year groups.

The sixth form, or Key Stage 5 is run in cooperation with other schools in the Harrow Collegium, students are offered A level courses and BTEC at the multiple sites.

Buildings

Current buildings
These were the result of a 2019 rebuild. It is part of the Government's second phase of the Priority Schools Building Programme (PSBP). The site is compact and limited by housing and other schools. The new building involved removing some mature trees, and fronting onto Headstone Lane. The main block is three storey high and about five classrooms long. (18.0m in depth and 50.5m) It provides 18 general teaching classrooms, 3 ICT classrooms, 2 Food Technology rooms, 1 special education needs seminar room . There are 4 departmental staff work rooms, a staff social room, 4 small group rooms and 4 two person admin offices and toilets and storage for staff and pupils.

The Great Hall and Round House
 1953 – The Great Hall, was completed on site
Architects: John and Elizabeth Eastwick-Field
Builders: The Anglo-Scottish Construction Company Ltd
Consultant Engineers: F. J. Samuely and Partners Ltd
2017 – The Great Hall was refurbishment, as a 600-seater performance venue
 2004 – Round House (drama centre) opened.

1950 buildings
These buildings have been totally demolished. They consisted of four ranges of single storey buildings and placed around a central tarmac-ed playground. The site was entered from Tilotson Road from the north. There was also a two-storey sixth form block completed in 2006 to the south with the Great Hall and Round House.
 1950 – The Main School Building (originally built for 900 pupils)
Architect: Cecil G Stillman, Middlesex County Council.
Builders: W. S. Try Ltd. High Street, Cowley.
Consultant Engineers: F. J. Samuely BSc (Eng)

Notable alumni

 Elvis Bwomono – professional footballer
 Loick Essien – singer
 Philip Glenister – actor
 Kristian Leontiou – singer
 Tyrick Mitchell – professional footballer
 Paul Rose – screenwriter and journalist
 Melissa Suffield – actress
 Gareth Thomas – politician
 Jerome Thomas – professional footballer
 Olufela Olomola - professional footballer
 Tushar Makwana - radio presenter

Notes

References

External links
Hatch End High School - home
Hatch End High School - twitter
Hatch End High School - Facebook

Academies in the London Borough of Harrow
Secondary schools in the London Borough of Harrow
Educational institutions established in 1948
1948 establishments in England